The 2023 FIM Moto3 World Championship will be part of the 75th F.I.M. Road Racing World Championship season.

Teams and riders 

All teams use Dunlop tyres.

Team changes 
Intact GP will enter the Moto3 class with Husqvarna and will be managed by Peter Öttl. This is Intact GP's third team across all classes, having a Moto2 team since  and a MotoE team since . The team will replace Max Biaggi's Max Racing Team who will leave the championship after four seasons. Max Racing Team was also previously managed by Öttl during its time in Moto3.
QJmotor Avintia Racing Team will leave the championship after five seasons.

Rider changes 
Dennis Foggia will leave Leopard Racing for he will be promoted to Moto2. He will be replaced by Jaume Masià, who will move from Red Bull KTM Ajo.
Joel Kelso will move to CFMoto Racing Prüstel GP from CIP Green Power, replacing Carlos Tatay who was left without a ride in 2023.
Daniel Holgado and Filippo Farioli will race for Red Bull KTM Tech3, replacing Adrián Fernández, who was left without a ride in 2023, and Deniz Öncü. Holgado will move from Red Bull KTM Ajo, while Farioli will make his Grand Prix racing debut, having raced in both Red Bull MotoGP Rookies Cup and FIM JuniorGP World Championship in 2022.
Ryusei Yamanaka and David Alonso will race for GasGas Aspar Team, replacing Sergio García and Izan Guevara who will both be promoted to Moto2.
Kaito Toba will move to Sic58 Squadra Corse from CIP Green Power, replacing Lorenzo Fellon.
Romano Fenati and Matteo Bertelle will race for Rivacold Snipers Team, replacing Andrea Migno and Alberto Surra, who were both left without rides in 2023. Meanwhile, Bertelle will move from the now defunct QJmotor Avintia Racing Team.
Deniz Öncü and José Antonio Rueda will race for Red Bull KTM Ajo, replacing Jaume Masià and Daniel Holgado. Öncü will move from Red Bull KTM Tech3.
Ayumu Sasaki and Collin Veijer will race for the newly-formed Liqui Moly Husqvarna Intact GP. Sasaki will move from the now defunct Max Racing Team, while Veijer will be making his Grand Prix racing debut, having raced in both the Red Bull MotoGP Rookies Cup and FIM JuniorGP World Championship in 2022.
Syarifuddin Azman will be making his full-time debut in Moto3 with MT Helmets - MSi, replacing Ryusei Yamanaka. He also raced in the FIM JuniorGP World Championship in 2022.
Lorenzo Fellon and David Salvador will race for CIP Green Power, replacing Kaito Toba and Joel Kelso.
Elia Bartolini, who raced for the now defunct QJmotor Avintia Racing Team, was left without a ride in 2023.
John McPhee, who raced for the now defunct Max Racing Team, left Moto3 for the Supersport World Championship as he is above the age limit of 28 when the season starts.

Regulation changes 
The minimum age to have a license for Moto3 was raised to 18 years old.

Calendar 
The following Grands Prix are provisionally scheduled to take place in 2023:

Grand Prix locations

Calendar changes 
 For the first time since 2006, Lusail in Qatar will not host the opening round due to "extensive renovation and remodelling to the paddock area and circuit facilities".
 The British Grand Prix will return to the International Paddock of the Silverstone Circuit for the first time since 2012.
 India and Kazakhstan are both scheduled to host their first World Championship motorcycle Grands Prix in 2023 at the Buddh International Circuit and the Sokol International Racetrack, respectively.
 The Hungarian Grand Prix was scheduled to make its debut in 2023 but was postponed until at least 2024 due to the unfinished construction of the circuit.
 The Aragon Grand Prix was omitted from the schedule for the first time since its introduction in 2010.
 The Finnish Grand Prix at Kymi Ring was under contract to feature in 2023, but was not included in the provisional calendar due to safety concerns of the 2022 Russian invasion of Ukraine.

Results and standings

Grands Prix

Riders' standings
Scoring system
Points were awarded to the top fifteen finishers. A rider had to finish the race to earn points.

Constructors' standings
Each constructor received the same number of points as their best placed rider in each race.

Teams' standings
The teams' standings were based on results obtained by regular and substitute riders; wild-card entries were ineligible.

Notes

References

External links
 

Moto3
Grand Prix motorcycle racing seasons
Moto3